George Earl Milstead (June 26, 1903 – August 9, 1977) was a professional baseball pitcher. A left-hander, he played three seasons in Major League Baseball from 1924 to 1926 with the Chicago Cubs of the National League.

He pitched in 36 games during his career, starting nine. He won three games, and lost seven. He has a career earned run average of 4.16. In addition, Milstead played 25 seasons for 25 teams in the minor leagues between 1921 and 1950, winning 231 games.

External links 

1903 births
1977 deaths
People from Cleburne, Texas
Major League Baseball pitchers
Chicago Cubs players
Bonham Favorites players
Bonham Bingers players
Houston Buffaloes players
Sapulpa Yanks players
Marshall Indians players
Decatur Commodores players
Los Angeles Angels (minor league) players
Toledo Mud Hens players
Birmingham Barons players
Baltimore Orioles (IL) players
Buffalo Bisons (minor league) players
Nashville Vols players
Reading Keystones players
Albany Senators players
Fort Worth Cats players
Tulsa Oilers (baseball) players
Oklahoma City Indians players
Cheyenne Indians players
Pampa Oilers players
Wichita Falls Spudders players
Greenville Majors players
Dallas Rebels players
Texarkana Bears players
Gladewater Bears players
Henderson Oilers players
Ballinger Cats players
Lake Charles Lakers players
Minor league baseball managers
Baseball players from Texas